Nino Bule (born 19 March 1976) is a Croatian football manager and former player who played as a striker. He is a most recently assistant manager of Croatian club NK Osijek.

International career
Bule made his debut for Croatia in a June 1999 Korea Cup match against Egypt, coming on as a 72nd-minute substitute for Jasmin Agić, and earned a total of 3 caps scoring no goals. His final international was a February 2004 friendly against Germany. He also played in two friendly matches for the Croatian national B team, and was also a member of the country's under-21 team in 1997, scoring two goals in four appearances.

Career statistics

Club
Source:

International

References

External links
 
 
 

1976 births
Living people
People from Čapljina
Croats of Bosnia and Herzegovina
Association football forwards
Croatian footballers
Croatia under-21 international footballers
Croatia international footballers
Croatia B international footballers
Croatian expatriate footballers
NK Zagreb players
Gamba Osaka players
HNK Hajduk Split players
ASKÖ Pasching players
FC Red Bull Salzburg players
FC Admira Wacker Mödling players
HNK Rijeka players
NK Inter Zaprešić players
Panserraikos F.C. players
NK Lokomotiva Zagreb players
Croatian Football League players
J1 League players
Austrian Football Bundesliga players
Super League Greece players
Expatriate footballers in Japan
Croatian expatriate sportspeople in Japan
Expatriate footballers in Austria
Croatian expatriate sportspeople in Austria
Expatriate footballers in Greece
Croatian expatriate sportspeople in Greece